The River Sherbourne is a river that flows under the centre of the city of Coventry, in the West Midlands, in England.

The source of the river is in the fields near Hawkes End in the parish of Allesley. It flows for about 8 miles or 13 km in a generally southeastern direction. In the centre of Coventry it flows through Spon End (where it is spanned by Vignoles Bridge) and it is culverted just before it reaches the Inner Ring Road and Spon Street, and continues through the suburb of Whitley. It joins the River Sowe (a tributary of the River Avon) south of the A45 road near Baginton.

The name Sherbourne is said to derive from Scir Burna, "clear stream" in Old English.

In 1935 and on eight more recent occasions, the upper Sherbourne around Allesley has dried up almost completely.

Coventry City Council has plans to open up a stretch of the river which is currently culverted, and runs beneath The Burges, a street in the city centre.

The grade II-listed Sherbourne Viaduct carries the Coventry to Rugby railway line over the river near the Charterhouse.

List of crossings
In downstream order from source to confluence with the Sowe:
Spon End Viaduct
Spon Bridge (grade II listed)
Vignoles Bridge
River is culverted beneath Coventry City Centre
Gosford Street
Bridge at the Charterhouse, off London Road
Sherbourne Viaduct
A4082 London Road
Whitley Abbey Bridge (grade II listed)
A45 road (Stonebridge Highway)

References 

Rivers of Warwickshire
Rivers of the West Midlands (county)
Rivers of Coventry
2Sherborne